Tikri Khurd is a village in North West region in Delhi under Narela Legislative Constituency. Khurd and Kalan are Persian words meaning small and big respectively. They are used to distinguish Kalan (Big) villages from Khurd (Small) villages when the two are paired with the same name.. The nearest railway station to the village is Narela. This village is on the Grand Trunk Road NH1.

See also 

 Tikri Kalan

References

Cities and towns in North West Delhi district